The Truckies is an Australian television drama which first screened on the ABC in 1978. The Truckies was about the pressures of life on the road for transport driver Chris and his wife Carol.

Cast
 Michael Aitkens as Chris 
 John Wood as Stokey 
 Colleen Hewett as Carol 
 Michael Carman as Jeff
 Frank Wilson as Wally
 John Ewart as Spanner
 Lois Ramsey as Dora

Production
It was executive produced by Oscar Whitbread and was made by several of the team behind the TV show Power Without Glory.

Critique
John Wood later recalled: "I thought it was a tremendously innovative show, but it came aground on the reef of ABC internal politics. Obviously there were things wrong with it, and I guess by going for truthfulness they stuffed up in a sense, because one of the problems in driving along in a truck and doing different angles and two shots and reverses is that it's totally impossible to match the engine revs at any time. But apart from that problem of not being able to match the soundtrack, I thought it was a wonderful show. Unfortunately it caused a lot of havoc, because the guy who took over as head of drama in Sydney had been an ex-sound recordist, and he regarded it as beneath his 'golden standard', so he was very willing to sabotage it. And it was a great excuse for the Sydney mob to say you stuffed up down there."

References

External links
The Truckies at Australian Television Information Archive
The Truckies at IMDb

Australian Broadcasting Corporation original programming
1978 Australian television series debuts
Australian drama television series
English-language television shows